Handenberg is an Austrian municipality in the district of Braunau am Inn in the Austrian state of Upper Austria.

Geography
The Fillmannsbach flows through the municipality from south to north.

References

Cities and towns in Braunau am Inn District